The Thomas M. O'Connor House on S. Bridge in Victoria, Texas, United States was built in 1885.  It was listed on the National Register of Historic Places in 1986.  The listing included two contributing buildings.

It was built with Italianate style and was remodelled in Classical Revival in the early 20th century.  It has a two-story pedimented portico with paired two-story columns on masonry piers.

In 1983 the house still belonged to the prominent O'Connor family.

It was listed on the NRHP as part of a study which listed numerous historic resources in the Victoria area.

See also

National Register of Historic Places listings in Victoria County, Texas

References

Houses completed in 1885
Houses in Victoria, Texas
Houses on the National Register of Historic Places in Texas
Italianate architecture in Texas
Neoclassical architecture in Texas
National Register of Historic Places in Victoria, Texas